Redmond Technology station, formerly Overlake Transit Center, is a bus station and future light rail station in Redmond, Washington, United States. The current bus station opened in 2002 and is located on the headquarters campus of Microsoft; it is served by Sound Transit Express and King County Metro.

In 2024, it will become the eastern terminus of the 2 Line, part of Sound Transit's Link light rail system.

Location

The light rail station will be located adjacent to State Route 520 near its interchange with NE 40th Street.

A pedestrian bridge over State Route 520, connecting the station to the Microsoft west campus, was funded by Microsoft and the City of Redmond in 2013 and began construction in 2020. It is expected to be complete in early 2023 and will be transferred to the city government.

History

Overlake Transit Center opened on February 4, 2002, and cost $8 million to construct with funds from Sound Transit, the City of Redmond, King County Metro, Microsoft, and the Federal Transit Administration, opened on February 4, 2002. The new transit center initially lacked passenger shelters and a paved parking lot, which were added in May. The  site was donated by Microsoft, who also contributed $1.2 million to the project and added commuter bus and shuttle bus services.

The park and ride closed in May 2017, as part of preparations for light rail construction. In late July, Sound Transit shifted bus service to a series of temporary bus bays near NE 36th Street and began demolition of the old transit center.

The new bus bays at the station were opened in December 2019 under the partially completed parking garage. During construction of the parking garage, cracks were discovered in the concrete above the bus exit. The bus stops and pedestrian walkways were temporarily moved from the garage in April 2020 while an investigation was conducted. The southeast corner of the garage, where several structural deficiencies were found, is planned to be demolished in 2021 and replaced by early 2022.

References

External links

Redmond Technology Station project page

Transport infrastructure completed in 2002
2002 establishments in Washington (state)
Future Link light rail stations
Transportation buildings and structures in King County, Washington
Buildings and structures in Redmond, Washington
Bus stations in Washington (state)
Sound Transit Express
King County Metro
Railway stations scheduled to open in 2024
Link light rail stations in King County, Washington